Chesters Bridge was a Roman bridge over the River North Tyne at Chollerford, Northumberland, England, and adjacent to the Roman fort of Cilurnum on Hadrian's Wall. The fort, mentioned in the Notitia Dignitatum, and now identified with the fort found at Chesters, was known as Cilurnum or Cilurvum.

In 2016, public access to Chesters Roman bridge abutments was suspended due to flood damage.

History

The remains of the bridge on the east bank of the River North Tyne are approached along a footpath from near Chollerford Bridge. These remains were first located in 1860. They form one of the most impressive and massive masonry structures to be seen on Hadrian's Wall.

Defence
The bridge carried the Military Way Roman road behind the wall across the River North Tyne at this point, and was defended by the adjacent cavalry fort at its foundation, later given over to infantry. An early inscription on an altar dedicated to Disciplina, found in 1978, indicates the earliest known military presence was a wing of cavalry, ala Augusta ob virtutem appellata ("named Augusta because of its valour").

First bridge

There were at least two bridges on this spot. The first, less massive than its successor, was probably contemporary with the construction of the Wall in AD 122–4. The masonry appears to have been plain but substantial, and the surviving hexagonal pier bears traces of dovetail cramps of iron set in lead which would have held the stones tightly together.

Second bridge
The second bridge was much larger and the new eastern abutment was a far more lofty affair than before, with splayed wing walls both north and south of the bridge's actual line. This abutment, its massive rectangular stones lifted into place using the lewis holes which are a feature of their upper surface, were held together with long iron ties channelled into the masonry to reinforce the front face. The lewis-holes widen as they penetrate. The lewis consisted of a split wedge which, after being inserted in the hole, was widened out to lock into it by the insertion of a strip of metal between the two halves of the wedge. The hook of the crane was then passed through the head of the lewis and the stone was ready for lifting. Few voussoirs (wedge-shaped stones from arches) have been found, but there is sufficient other evidence in the form of cornice blocks, grooved to take vertical parapet slabs, and angled mouldings, to show that the bridge was of stone, although others state that the second bridge had a timber superstructure. This second bridge seems to date from the early 3rd century [others give AD 162-5 or AD 206]. There is no evidence for any further repair or alteration to the bridge after that date. There is a male fertility symbol carved into the northern face of the eastern abutment.

Excavation
In the early 19th century Nathaniel Clayton, owner of Chesters House and Estate, moved hundreds of tons of earth to cover over the last remains of the fort as part of his parkland landscaping, thereby creating a smooth uninterrupted grassland slope down to the River Tyne; he collected, before they disappeared, a number of Roman artefacts which he preserved in the family. However his son John Clayton, a noted antiquarian, removed all his father's work, exposing the fort, excavating, and establishing a small museum for his finds. John Clayton also made excavations at Housesteads Fort, Carrawburgh Mithraic Temple, and Carvoran, amongst others.

See also 
Cilurnum
Chollerford Bridge
Low Brunton
Petrosomatoglyph Male fertility symbol
List of Roman bridges

References

Bridges in Roman Britain
Forts of Hadrian's Wall
Bridges in Northumberland
Roman sites in Northumberland
English Heritage sites in Northumberland
Crossings of the River Tyne